The 2020 Myanmar National League is the 11th season of the Myanmar National League, the top Myanmar professional league for association football clubs, since its establishment in 2009, also known as MPT Myanmar National League due to the sponsorship deal with Myanma Posts and Telecommunications. Recently, AIA agreed a sponsorship deal with Myanmar National League in order to support both MNL and Myanmar Football. A total of 12 football teams will compete in the league. 

Shan United are the defending champions, while Chin United and I.S.P.E have been promoted from the 2019 MNL-2. Shan United were crowned champions in the final matchday defeating 4-time winner Yadanarbon.

The 1st transfer window is from 9 November 2019 to 10 January 2020 . The 2nd mid season transfer window is from 6 April 2020 to 7 May 2020.

On March 1, all of Myanmar National League matches was played behind closed doors as broadcast only events.  On March 24, MNL postponed all the matches after first reports of COVID-19 cases in the country. 

On June 10, after MFF & MNL meeting, Zwekapin United and Chin United were disbanded from Myanmar National League. All Zwekapin United and Chin United  matches, goals and marks are cancelled.

All remaining matches will be held at Yangon due to the COVID-19 pandemic.

Yangon United crashed out of the title race despite being obliterated by Shan United 4–0 on 16 September 2020. Ayeyawady United lost their unbeaten run after losing 2–1 to Shan United.

Changes from last season

Team changes

Promoted Clubs
Promoted from the 2019 MNL-2
 Chin United
 I.S.P.E

Relegated Clubs

Relegated from the 2019 Myanmar National League
  Dagon (Withdrawn from League)
 Chinland

2020 Title Sponsor

Myanma Posts and Telecommunications signed 3 years contract with MNL. They help to develop Myanmar Football and Youth program.

Clubs

Stadiums

(*) – not ready to play. MNL clubs that have not had their home stadia ready to host home matches currently use Aung San Stadium and Thuwunna Stadium in Yangon.

Personnel and sponsoring
Note: Flags indicate national team as has been defined under FIFA eligibility rules. Players may hold more than one non-FIFA nationality.

Managerial changes

Foreign players

League table

Positions by round

Results by match played

Matches 
Fixtures and results of the Myanmar National League 2020 season.

Week 1

Week 2

Week 3

Week 4

Week 5

Week 6

Week 7

Week 8

Week 9

Week 10

Week 11

Week 12

Week 13

Week 14

Week 15

Week 16

Week 17

Week 18

Week 19

Week 20

Results

Season statistics

Top scorers
As of  1 October 2020.

Most assists
As of  1 October 2020.

Clean sheets
As of 1 Oct 2020.

Hat-tricks

Awards

Monthly awards

See also
2020 MNL-2

References

External links
 Myanmar National League Official Website
 Myanmar National League Facebook Official Page

Myanmar National League seasons
Myanmar
2020 in Burmese football
Myanmar National League, 2020